The Maggie dela Riva Story: God... Why Me? is a 1994 Filipino crime drama film co-written and directed by Carlo J. Caparas. The film stars Dawn Zulueta in the title role, alongside Miguel Rodriguez, John Regala, Michael de Mesa, and Ricky Davao as the rapists. The film dramatizes the case of actress Maggie de la Riva's ordeal in 1967.

Plot
  
A young Maggie de la Riva finishes filming a new scene for a movie. While she and her family celebrate her big breaks in the film industry, several sex crimes involving wealthy socialites, actresses, and TV and radio hosts take place within the Metro Manila region, then part of Rizal Province. The crimes, committed by young men from wealthy and influential families, are done by taking the victims to a small hotel where they are sexually abused and raped by the perpetrators. Later, Maggie falls in love with her best friend, Albert, and the two hang out on several occasions.

With the sex crime rates increasing, Maggie's family and friends, as well as the movie industry become concerned following rumors. Albert calls Maggie one night and informs her of his conversation with the production team about another rape victim, a socialite and actress. The next day, Maggie and the production team discuss filming another scene due to the absence of a cast member. During a break, a fellow cast member and Maggie theorize that little of the crimes' details are known possibly due to the shame the rape victims suffer while the perpetrators are influential. While driving home that evening, Maggie and her maid Mameng stop for refueling while a Pontiac carrying a quartet of influential men coming home from a long night of drinking followed them at the distance. After refueling, Maggie drives but the Pontiac follows them again, making swerving and dangerous moves. As both cars stop at the de la Riva household, Mameng tries to alert the inhabitants only for the four men to get out of their car and abduct Maggie while Mameng and their mother Pilar watch in horror.

The quartet, consisting of Jaime Jose, Edgardo Aquino, Basilio Pineda, and Rogelio Canal, intimidate Maggie and drive her to a motel where they silence the staff and take her to a suite. They then intimidate and abuse Maggie further, including physically beating her when she refuses to comply. The quartet undress her until she breaks down and all four men leave the room. Taking turns, Jose, Aquino, Pineda, and Canal rape Maggie and revive her with cold water as well as torture her when she goes into a state of shock. Meanwhile, Pilar calls her son-in-law and Medy's husband Ben Suba, to call in journalists and authorities and inform them of Maggie's abduction.

Back at the motel, the four perpetrators redress Maggie and threaten her with death if she breaks her silence. A taxicab takes her to her home where she is greeted by authorities and the press and comforted by Albert. In the next days, her family convinces her to file a case against the perpetrators, which she willingly does. A manhunt operation was set to find the four suspects wherein Jose becomes the first to fall into the authorities. While Pineda and Canal are arrested in Batangas, Aquino surrenders days later.

Lawyer Estanislao Fernandez offers his services to Maggie after the latter meets Imelda Marcos. Maggie then moves to a heavily guarded police safehouse in Camp Crame wherein failed attempts and threats against her continue. The trial then takes place in Quezon City wherein Maggie, the witnesses, and the suspects give their testimonies. The court, presided by Lourdes Paredes San Diego, find the suspects' testimonies contemptuous. Attempts to have the four perpetrators sentenced to death by electric chair become difficult due to monetary bribes and other influences.

The court ultimately reaches a guilty verdict and sentences the four to death by electric chair. As more evidence on the sex crimes surface after the Supreme Court upholds the verdict of the lower court, Canal dies of a drug overdose in New Bilibid Prison. The surviving accused submit their appeals but are then denied. The plan to carry out the death sentence becomes more difficult when executives of the justice department decide that only two will be executed. Ben Suba meets with Vicente Abad Santos, who asks him to find more hard evidence, which he eventually does. After Abad Santos receives the said evidence, which are photos of the perpetrators committing their crimes on the wealthy female victims, he calls Ferdinand Marcos in Malacanang to ask him for approval to carry out the execution.

On the day of the execution, as Maggie visits a church to pray, Jose's mother, Dolores, visits Malacanang and asks Imelda Marcos to help spare her son from death row and instead place him under life imprisonment, adding that he was only inadvertently involved in the crime. Imelda however, denies this appeal despite showing mercy to Dolores. While Aquino showed remorse as he walks to the death chamber and has his head shaved, Jose and Pineda are forcibly dragged to the chamber; Jose weeps and calls for his mother while Pineda freaks out and enters into a state of insanity. After a woman, a rape victim, is forcibly dragged from the death chamber, the three accused are brought to the electric chair and are electrocuted.

Maggie and Albert meet up at their hangout spot at a beach wherein they break up their relationship due to her ordeal. In the end, the real Maggie de la Riva comforts her daughter and tells her to be strong in times of danger.

Cast

Dawn Zulueta as Maggie dela Riva
Miguel Rodríguez as Jaime "Tisoy/Joey" José
The leader of the rape gang. The late Rodríguez was cast in the role due to his physical similarities to the real Jaime José.
John Regala as Basílio Pineda, Jr.
Ricky Davao as Eduardo Aquino
Michael de Mesa as Rogelio Cañal
Ali Sotto as First Lady Imelda Marcos
Laurice Guillen as Judge Lourdes Paredes San Diego
The presiding judge of the case who handed down the death sentence, and later becomes the first female Court of Appeals presiding justice. This was the second time Guillen portrayed a political figure after playing President Corazon Aquino in the 1988 political thriller film, A Dangerous Life.
Tonton Gutierrez as Albert
Liza Lorena as Alicia Vergel
Maggie's friend in the film industry.
Roberto Arévalo as Atty. Estanislao Fernández
Maggie's Lawyer
Lito Legaspi as Col. Tomas Karingal
Boots Anson-Roa as Pilar "Mama Pili" Torrente-dela Riva
Maggie's mother
Tony Mabesa as Appeal Lawyer
Mia Gutierrez as Mameng
Dela Riva's household maid and Personal Assistant. She was loosely based on Helen Calderón, Dela Riva’s chambermaid who was with her at the time of the assault.
Anna Rivera as Medy dela Riva-Suba
Maggie's elder sister. Rivera is Dela Riva’s real-life niece.
Phillip Gamboa as Ben Suba
Augusto Victa as Justice Vicente Abad Santos
Marita Zobel as Dolores Jose

Maggie dela Riva made a cameo appearance in the ending as herself, comforting her daughter Camille.

Production
Gabby Concepcion was initially cast as one of the rapists. However, it didn't push through due to scheduling conflicts.

References

External links

1994 films
1994 drama films
1990s crime drama films
Philippine crime drama films
Crime films based on actual events
Drama films based on actual events
Films about violence against women
Films about capital punishment
Films directed by Carlo J. Caparas
Films set in the Philippines
Viva Films films